Ellington Public Schools is a public school district in Tolland County, Connecticut, United States, based in Ellington, Connecticut.

Schools
The Tolland County School District has three elementary schools, one middle school, and one high school.

Elementary schools 
Crystal Lake Elementary School
Center Primary School
Windermere Elementary School

Middle school
Ellington Middle School

High School

Ellington High School

References

External links
 Ellington Public Schools
 Official Facebook Page

Ellington, Connecticut
School districts in Connecticut